Akayla is a 1991 Hindi-language action thriller film directed by Ramesh Sippy and produced by the Mushir - Riaz duo. It featured an ensemble cast of Amitabh Bachchan, Jackie Shroff, Amrita Singh, Meenakshi Sheshadri, Aditya Pancholi, Kiran Juneja, Keith Stevenson (in his debut) as the primary antagonist in a dual role, and Shashi Kapoor in a extended special appearance. It was the fourth and final collaboration between Bachchan and Ramesh Sippy after Sholay (1975), Shaan (1980) and Shakti (1982). It also marked the former's last onscreen collaboration with Sheshadri and Kapoor and his first one with Shroff, they would later work together in films like Eklavya (2007) and Sarkar 3 (2017). Also, it was the second time Singh and Sheshadri featured together, the first film being Toofan (1989) which also starred Bachchan in the lead role.  

Akayla released worldwide on 8th November 1991. Upon release, the film received mixed-to-positive reviews from critics, with praise for Bachchan and Singh's performances, but criticism for the predictable plot and Stevenson's performance. Commercially, the film was an average grosser and the 7th highest-grossing Bollywood film of 1991.

Plot

CID Inspector Vijay Verma is a very lonely cop whose only family is a younger brother Ajay Verma, who is studying abroad. He also has two good friends Shekhar  and Seema. Vijay sacrifices his love for Seema for his friend Shekhar, little knowing that Seema too was interested in him. One day when he arrests the criminal mastermind Tony Briganza, he is shocked when Tony is released from police custody because his corrupt lawyer shows the court a videotape showing him at a completely different place, so therefore he couldn't have committed the crime. From this day on, they become enemies and Vijay is hot on Tony's trail every time he commits a crime. Vijay eventually meets nightclub dancer Sapna  and the two eventually become very close to each other.

While watching Seeta Aur Geeta with Sapna, he realises that two people can be at different places at the same time if they are twins. He realises that Tony has a twin retarded brother called Jojo, who covers for him each time he commits a crime so he can get away with it easily. He successfully gets Tony arrested and put in prison. However, Tony escapes and hides out at the house of Shekhar and Seema. When Shekhar realises that Tony and Jojo are wanted criminals, he tries to contact Vijay but Tony and Jojo find out and kill Shekhar and Seema. Vijay is devastated by the loss of his two best friends and is comforted by Sapna, whom he falls in love with. They both eventually some time later confess their love for each other and plan to marry soon. After the death of his friends, he kills Jojo as revenge for his friends and sets his sights on Tony. Tony is outraged by the death of his brother and now has his brother Ajay and his newly-wed wife on his hit list, he eventually tracks them down and kills them. Tony targets Sapna next and tries to kill her but Vijay saves her just in time and thus begins a Cat and Mouse game between Vijay and Tony. Vijay now bitter that all his loved ones are dead targets and aims to kill Tony once and for all but the police commissioner warns him not to take the law into his hands. Vijay however cannot bear anymore deaths and punishment being handed out by Tony and resigns from police duty as he no longer wants to arrest Tony, his aim is to put an end to his criminal activities and kill him for good. Vijay tracks down Tony and even though he changes his mind and wants to hand him over to the police but Tony ridicules him and after seeing that Tony can never change he finally kills him. The Police Commissioner arrives and despite knowing that it is wrong to take the law in to your own hands, sympathizes with Vijay and welcomes him back to the police force.

Cast
 Amitabh Bachchan as Inspector Vijay Verma
 Amrita Singh as Sapna
 Jackie Shroff as Shekhar (Vijay's Friend)
 Meenakshi Seshadri as Seema (Shekhar's Wife)
 Keith Stevenson as Tony / Jojo Briganza (Twin Brothers)
 Mangal Dhillon as Lawyer 
 Helen as Seema's Mother 
 Aditya Pancholi as Ajay Verma
 Kiran Juneja as Neetu (Ajay's Girlfriend)
 Kanwaljit Singh as Inspector Ahmed
 Shashi Kapoor as Police Commissioner
 S M Zaheer as Judge
 Lalit Mohan Tiwari as Sapna Brother
 Vikram Gokhale as Doctor
 Mahesh Anand as Ranjeet
 Ajay Wadhavkar as Traffic Police Constable (Cameo Role) in the song "Chal Chal Re Chal Meri Ram Piyaari))

Soundtrack

References

External links
 

1990s Hindi-language films
1991 films
Films directed by Ramesh Sippy
Films scored by Laxmikant–Pyarelal